Kenneth Brown may refer to:

Kenneth Brown (playwright) (born 1954), Canadian playwright, actor, director, and producer
Kenneth Brown (academic) (1933–2010), American peace studies academic
Kenneth Brown (author) (Kenneth P. Brown, Jr.), president of the Alexis de Tocqueville Institution
Kenneth Brown (cricketer) (born 1967), South African cricketer
Kenneth Brown (pastoralist) (1837–1876), Western Australian pastoralist, explorer, and executed murderer
Kenneth Brown (journalist) (1868–1958), American journalist
Kenneth Brown (interior designer) (born 1971), American interior designer
Kenneth Brown (mathematician) (born 1945), American professor working in category and cohomology theory
Kenneth Charles Brown (1925–2016), Canadian diplomat
Kenneth H. Brown (1936–2022), American playwright and writer
Kenneth L. Brown (born 1936), American diplomat
Kenneth M. Brown (1887–1955), Canadian pulp and paper worker and political figure in Newfoundland
Kenneth Francis Brown (1919–2014), American politician and businessman

See also
Ken Brown (disambiguation)
Kenneth Browne (disambiguation)